Rima Sharp is a sinuous rille on the moon, centered on selenographic coordinates 46.02°N 50.36°W.  The name of the feature was approved by the IAU in 1964.  It is named after the nearby crater Sharp.

References

Geological features on the Moon
LQ04 quadrangle